Kosmonavtlar ("Cosmonauts", formerly known as Проспект Космонавтов, Prospekt Kosmonavtov) is a space-programme-themed station of the Tashkent Metro. It honors Soviet cosmonauts such as Yuri Gagarin and Valentina Tereshkova, the first man and woman in space. The station was opened on 8 December 1984 as part of the inaugural section of the line, between Alisher Navoiy and Toshkent. 

Until 2018 it was illegal to photograph the Tashkent metro, because it also worked as a nuclear bomb shelter.

Design 
The architectural decoration of the station is on the theme of space. The metro stop is decorated in bright-colored anodized aluminium. The interior is decorated with blue ceramic medallions with images of Ulugbek, Icarus, Valentina Tereshkova, Yuri Gagarin, Vyacheslav Volkov and Vladimir Dzhanibekov and a mural runs the full length of the loading platform, depicting major space-related events and icons such as Galileo, Sputnik and Yuri Gagarin. The ceiling resembles the Milky Way, which shows glass stars.

Gallery

References

Tashkent Metro stations
Railway stations opened in 1984